Alain Van Den Bossche (born 17 November 1965) is a former Belgian racing cyclist. He won the Belgian national road race title in 1993.

References

External links

1965 births
Living people
Belgian male cyclists
People from Geraardsbergen
Cyclists from East Flanders